The green leaf, or scaly-breasted lorikeet, is an Australian bird.

Green leaf may also refer to:

Ale Yarok (Green Leaf), an Israeli cannabis legalisation party.
 The Green Leaf, an American experimental rock band
 Green leaf box, a eucalypt native to northern Australia
 Green leaf volatiles, organic compounds released when plants suffer tissue damage
 Green leaf warbler, found in the Caucasus Mountains in South-Central Europe

See also
 Greenleaf (disambiguation)
 Green Leaves (disambiguation)